Adams County is a county in the U.S. state of Washington. As of the 2020 census, the population was 20,613. The county seat is at Ritzville, and its largest city is Othello. The county was formed out of Whitman County in November 1883 and is named after John Adams, the second President of the United States.

Adams County's two most populous cities are Ritzville and Othello. Ritzville is located in the northeastern corner of the county at the junction of I-90 and US 395, making it a popular stop for travelers. Ritzville is an hour's drive from Spokane. Othello is located in the southwestern panhandle of the county.

History
The Governor of Washington Territory approved the proposed Adams County Articles of Incorporation on November 28, 1883. At that time Adams County and Franklin County were formed out of territory from Whitman County. The first County meeting (December 19, 1883) established Ritzville as the county seat. By 1885 the county offices were established, in a wood-frame house purchased for the purpose in Ritzville.

The 1890 census showed that Adams County boasted 2,098 residents. The growing population justified a purpose-built courthouse, so construction began on February 23, 1892, for a two-story brick building with a tower and a basement.

Wheat farming was a main focus of early residents. In 1909 Adams County proclaimed itself "bread basket of the world," with Ritzville reportedly being the world's largest inland wheat exporter.

1905 - "A number of officials also appeared before the board [of county commissioners] and asked that an addition be built to the court house for the accommodation of the auditor and treasurer who require more room on account of the increase in business." The architectural firm of Preusse and Zittel of Spokane began drawing plans for the proposed addition in March 1905. Adams County Commissioners (Joseph M. Batten, Henry J. Allert and Fred Kembel) approved the new addition in May 1905.

In 1905 the County courthouse was expanded. Work was completed in October 1905.

Wheat producers in Adams County used dryland farming in order to overcome the relative aridity of the county's climate. They let the wheatfields lie fallow in alternate years, holding sufficient moisture to raise profitable crops.

The county's population decreased significantly during the first half of the twentieth century, dropping by nearly five thousand from 1910 to 1940.

In 1940 the courthouse was replaced by a three-story building, with a two-story jail at the rear. Construction was completed in December 1940.

In 1943 the Federal government approved the Columbia Basin Project. It began impacting Adams County in 1946, when construction of the East Low Canal and the Potholes East Canal began. This work, and the ensuing increased agricultural production from irrigated crops, led to continual population increases. The population had increased by 12,500 from 1940 to 2010.

Geography

Major highways
 Interstate 90
 U.S. Route 395

Adjacent counties
Lincoln County - north
Whitman County - east
Franklin County - south
Grant County - west

National protected areas
 Columbia National Wildlife Refuge (part)
 Saddle Mountain National Wildlife Refuge (part)

Demographics

Adams County and Franklin County have the highest per capita percentage of Latino residents in the state.

2000 census
As of the census of 2000, there were 16,428 people, 5,229 households, and 4,094 families living in the county. The population density was 8 people per square mile (3/km2). There were 5,773 housing units at an average density of 3 per square mile (1/km2). The racial makeup of the county was 64.96% White, 0.28% Black or African American, 0.68% Native American, 0.60% Asian, 0.04% Pacific Islander, 30.69% from other races, and 2.75% from two or more races. 16.3% were of German, 6.2% identified as U.S. or American and 5.6% English ancestry. 57.0% spoke English, 41.7% Spanish and 1.2% German as their first language.

There were 5,229 households, out of which 44.00% had children under the age of 18 living with them, 63.50% were married couples living together, 10.10% had a female householder with no husband present, and 21.70% were non-families. 18.70% of all households were made up of individuals, and 7.70% had someone living alone who was 65 years of age or older.  The average household size was 3.09 and the average family size was 3.52.

In the county, the population was spread out, with 34.20% under the age of 18, 9.80% from 18 to 24, 26.30% from 25 to 44, 19.40% from 45 to 64, and 10.40% who were 65 years of age or older. The median age was 30 years. For every 100 females there were 104.50 males. For every 100 females age 18 and over, there were 102.10 males.

The median income for a household in the county was $33,888, and the median income for a family was $37,075. Males had a median income of $28,740 versus $21,597 for females. The per capita income for the county was $13,534. About 13.60% of families and 18.20% of the population were below the poverty line, including 24.00% of those under age 18 and 8.90% of those age 65 or over.

2010 census
As of the 2010 census, there were 18,728 people, 5,720 households, and 4,410 families living in the county. The racial makeup of the county was 62.5% white, 1.9% American Indian, 0.7% Asian, 0.6% black or African American, 31.5% from other races, and 2.8% from two or more races. Those of Hispanic or Latino origin made up 59.3% of the population. In terms of ancestry, 16.4% were German, 6.8% were Irish, 5.6% were English, and 2.2% were American.

Of the 5,720 households, 47.9% had children under the age of 18 living with them, 58.7% were married couples living together, 11.8% had a female householder with no husband present, 22.9% were non-families, and 18.8% of all households were made up of individuals. The average household size was 3.25 and the average family size was 3.71. The median age was 29.0 years.

The median income for a household in the county was $40,829 and the median income for a family was $43,551. Males had a median income of $35,695 versus $25,160 for females. The per capita income for the county was $16,689. About 19.0% of families and 25.1% of the population were below the poverty line, including 36.6% of those under age 18 and 12.6% of those age 65 or over.

Communities

Cities

Othello
Ritzville (County seat)

Towns

Hatton
Lind
Washtucna

Unincorporated communities

Benge
Cunningham
Marcellus
Marengo
Paha
Ralston

Ghost towns

Ankeny
Keystone
Rockwell
Servia
Taunton
Tokio

Politics
Adams is a strongly Republican county. The last Democrat to win the county was Franklin D. Roosevelt in 1936. It was one of only three counties in the state to be won by Barry Goldwater in 1964. Adams County's unbroken streak of Republican votes in presidential elections is the longest of any county in Washington. The Republican candidate has won by more than 13 points in every Presidential election since 1968, with margins of over 30 points in the five presidential elections since 2000. George W. Bush won the county by over 40 points both times he ran.

In other elections the results fare similarly. The last Democratic candidate for governor to carry Adams County was Clarence D. Martin in 1936. The last Democratic candidate for the U.S. Senate to win the county was Henry M. Jackson in 1982.

In the 2008 presidential election, John McCain received 66.32% of the county's vote. Meanwhile, Republican gubernatorial candidate Dino Rossi received 69.83% of the county's vote. The county also gave Republican representative Cathy McMorris Rodgers 82.45% of the vote. Republican Sam Reed received 74.6% of the county's vote in his run for re-election as Washington Secretary of State, Republican Allan Martin received 67.25% of the vote for state treasurer, and Republican Rob McKenna received 76.28% in his re-election run for attorney general. All county positions for which candidates were affiliated with parties were won by Republicans.

Courthouses
From Ritzville's designation as county seat in 1884 until 1892, courts were briefly held in rented space before the county purchased a building from N.H. Greene in 1885. In 1891 the commission bonded $20,000 in order to erect a permanent court house. The building was built by the Spokane firm of Burnham and Clapp and completed by August 20, 1891, when it was accepted by the county. It was a two-story brick building with a four-story tower and a stone basement. A two-story addition was added to the front in 1905 with a new four-story tower, giving the courthouse a whole new appearance. This building was replaced by the current art-deco courthouse in 1940.

See also
National Register of Historic Places listings in Adams County, Washington
List of counties in Washington

Notes

References

Further reading
Available online through the Washington State Library's Classics in Washington History collection
Amber Waves and Undertow -Peril, Hope, Sweat, and Downright Nonchalance in Dry Wheat Country- a book written by Steve Turner and published by the University of Oklahoma Press 2009 -

External links
Adams County, Washington
Image of 1892 Adams County Courthouse at the Washington State Digital Archives.
Image of 1905 Adams County Courthouse addition at the Washington State Digital Archives.
Image of 1941 Adams County Courthouse at the Washington State Digital Archives.
Top Hat Motel in Ritzville, WA

 
1883 establishments in Washington Territory
Populated places established in 1883
Eastern Washington